2MASS J00361617+1821104 (abbreviated to 2MASS 0036+1821) is a brown dwarf, located in 28.6 light-years from Earth in the constellation Pisces. It was discovered in 2000 by I. Neill Reid et al. Kinematically, it does not belong to any known moving group, been grouped with other "field stars".

2MASS 0036+1821 is of spectral type L3.5, the surface temperature is 1300-2000 Kelvin. As with other brown dwarfs of spectral type L, its spectrum is dominated of metal hydrides and alkali metals. Its position shifts due to its proper motion by 0.9071 arcseconds per year. 

The surface of 2MASS 0036+1821 is completely covered by clouds, although cloud deck appear to be thin (less than ten optical depths) Because of unusually rapid rotation, it is possessing a strong magnetic field over 1000 G at the photosphere level, and is well known for its radio emissions.

See also
 List of star systems within 25–30 light-years

External links
Entry at DwarfArchives.org 
Discovery paper
Simbad

References

Pisces (constellation)
Brown dwarfs
J00361617+1821104
L-type stars